Mbiyu is a name. It may refer to:

 David Mbiyu (born 1971), English freelance photojournalist
 Mbiyu Koinange (1907–1981), Kenyan politician
 Koinange Wa Mbiyu (1866–1960), Kenyan Kikuyu chief